USS LST-483/Brewster County (LST-483) was an  built for the United States Navy during World War II. Later renamed for Brewster County, Texas, she was the only US Naval vessel to bear the name.

Construction
LST-483 was laid down on 21 September 1942, under Maritime Commission (MARCOM) contract, MC hull 1002, by  Kaiser Shipyards, Yard No. 4, Richmond, California; launched on 30 December 1942; and commissioned on 3 May 1943.

Service history
During World War II, LST-483 was assigned to the Asiatic-Pacific Theater and participated in the following operations: the Capture and Occupation of Saipan June and July 1944; the Tinian Capture and Occupation July 1944; the Leyte landings October 1944; and the Assault and Occupation of Okinawa Gunto April 1945.

Post-war service
Following the war, LST-483 performed occupation duty in the Far East until early February, 1946. Upon her return to the United States, she was decommissioned on 10 February 1946. The tank landing ship was renamed USS Brewster County (LST-483) on 1 July 1955, after a county in Texas. Her name was struck from the Naval Vessel Register on 11 August 1955, and she was later sunk as a target.

Awards
LST-483 earned four battle stars for World War II service.

Notes 

Citations

Bibliography 

Online resources

External links

LST-1-class tank landing ships of the United States Navy
Ships built in Richmond, California
1942 ships
World War II amphibious warfare vessels of the United States
Brewster County, Texas
S3-M2-K2 ships